Gold master or golden master may refer to:

 a final version of software ready for release to manufacturing (The term is taken from the audio record making industry, specifically the process of mastering)
 a master recording from which copies can be made
 The Golden Master, a 1939 pulp novel featuring The Shadow written by Walter Gibson under the house name Maxwell Grant